The Great Mound is a massive Native American mound in the southwestern part of the U.S. state of Ohio. Because of the mound's height and its placement on a ridgeline, an individual at the summit can see for a great distance. In the late nineteenth century, it was theorized that mounds such as the Great Mound were built as observation or watch points, and that the builders maintained the ability to light fires atop the mounds as a method of communicating across wide distances. The potential of these mounds for long-distance communication was demonstrated in 1990 by three groups of volunteers.

Built by the Adena culture, the Great Mound has been reduced by multiple instances of unofficial diggings.  In 1879, locals removed a small portion of the mound's summit, finding artifacts such as bones and the remnants of fires.  Later years saw the destruction of a more significant part of the top; today, only about 75% of the mound is free from disturbances.  Nevertheless, the mound is believed to be a significant archaeological site; its size is believed to indicate the stability of the culture that built it and the dedication of its members to commemorating those buried within it.  In recognition of its archaeological value, the Great Mound was listed on the National Register of Historic Places in 1971.

References

Adena culture
Archaeological sites in Ohio
National Register of Historic Places in Butler County, Ohio
Archaeological sites on the National Register of Historic Places in Ohio
Mounds in Ohio
1879 archaeological discoveries